The Counsel to the Navy Department, Ministry of Defence originally called Counsel to the Navy Board  was an appointed legal adviser to the Royal Navy from 1673 to 1995.

History
The office was originally established in 1673 when the post holder was assigned to the Navy Board only. In 1696 the office holders duties were expanded and he was authorized to act on behalf of the Board of Admiralty as well. The office was abolished in 1679, as a result of cost saving measures being undertaken in regard to cutting excessive naval expenditures. In 1696 the office was reestablished and in 1824 it was merged with the office of the Judge Advocate of the Fleet. In 1832 the Navy Board was abolished and its previous functions were absorbed into the Admiralty the office holders title then changed to Counsel to the Admiralty until 1964 when the Department of Admiralty was absorbed into the Ministry of Defence where it became the Navy Department until 2008.

From 1824 the individual appointed held both offices and titles of Judge Advocate of the Fleet and Counsel concurrently until 1995 when it was abolished. The office holder superintended the Office of the Solicitor to the Admiralty.

Counsel to the Navy Board
Included:
 1673-1686, R Wright 
 1685-1686, C. Porter  
 1686-1696, W. Killingworth

Counsel for the Affairs of the Admiralty and Navy
Included:
 1696-1702, T. Lechmere
 1703-1708, W. Ettrick 
 1708-1709 C. Phipps 
 1709-1711, G. Townsend 
 1711-1715, W. G. Ettrick 
 1715-1726, G. Townsend 
 1726-1737, J, Baynes 
 1737-1742, J. Hunter 
 1742-1742, C. Clarke 
 1743-1747, Hon. H. Legge 
 1747-1757, S. Jervis 
 1757-1770, R. Hussey 
 1770-1791, F. Cust 
 1791-1795 Hon. T. Brodrick 
 1795-1801, H. S. Perceval 
 1801-1824, Thomas Jervis 
 1824-1828, H. Twiss 
 1828-1832, H. J. Shepherd

Counsel to the Admiralty
Note: The office holder in some editions of the official British navy list is styled as Counsel to the Naval Department.
 1832-1845, H. J. Shepherd 
 1845-1849, R. Godson 
 1849-1854, Richard Budden Crowder
 1854-1855, Thomas Phinn
 1855-1859, William Atherton
 1859-1863, Robert Collier, 1st Baron Monkswell
 1863-1866, Thomas Phinn 
 1866-1875, John Walter Huddleston
 1875–1904, Alexander Staveley Hill
 1904–1924, Reginald Brodie Dyke Acland 
 1924-1933, Charles Murray Pitman
 1933-1943, J G Trapnell
 1943-1945, J Lhind Pratt
 1945-1964, Ewen Montagu

Counsel to the Navy Department (Ministry of Defence)
 1964-1972, Ewen Montagu
 1973-1986, William Howard
 1986-1994, Felix Waley 
 1995 J L Sessions

Offices under this office
 Solicitor to the Admiralty

References

Sources
 Counsel 1673-1870', in Office-Holders in Modern Britain: Volume 4, Admiralty Officials 1660-1870, ed. J C Sainty (London, 1975), p. 78. British History Online http://www.british-history.ac.uk/office-holders/vol4/p78 [accessed 8 January 2019].

Law Officers of the Royal Navy